Shelly Boshart Davis (born January 8, 1980) is an Oregon Republican politician and small business-owner. She serves in the Oregon House of Representatives for District 15, representing parts of Linn and Benton counties, including the cities of Albany, Millersburg, and Tangent.

Early life and career 
Boshart Davis grew up in the Mid-Willamette Valley on her family's farm. She earned her Bachelor of Science in Business Administration from Oregon State University. In 2018, Boshart Davis took over her family's trucking company.

She serves on the Government Affairs Committee for the Albany Chamber of Commerce, and previously sat on the local United Way board. In 2016, she was appointed to the Linn County Budget Committee. She is involved with the Linn County Farm Bureau, Oregon Women for Agriculture, Oregon Trucking Association, and Oregon Seed Council. Nationally, she has served as president for the U.S. Forage Export Council, and she sits on the advisory committee for the Agriculture Transportation Coalition. Boshart Davis has been involved in agricultural education in the Mid-Valley area, sitting on the board for the nonprofit association, Oregon Aglink, and volunteering with three local schools through the Adopt-A-Farmer program.

Political career 
After Andy Olson announced he would not seek an 8th term as Representative from District 15 in the Oregon Legislature, Boshart Davis announced she would be running to fill the vacancy with Olson's endorsement. She ran an unopposed primary election campaign. In November 2018, Boshart Davis defeated Democrat, Jerred Taylor and Independent, Cynthia Hyatt to become the representative of House District 15.

She assumed office on January 15, 2019, as an official member of the 80th Oregon Legislative Assembly. She serves on the House Committee on Business and Labor, House Committee on Agriculture and Land Use, and on the Joint Committee on Carbon Reduction.

References

External links
 Campaign website
 Legislative website

Republican Party members of the Oregon House of Representatives
People from Albany, Oregon
1980 births
Oregon State University alumni
Women state legislators in Oregon
21st-century American farmers
Oregon legislative sessions
Living people
21st-century American women politicians
21st-century American politicians